Jimmy Duggan may refer to:
Jimmy Duggan (Gaelic footballer) (born 1948), Irish Gaelic footballer
Jimmy Duggan (hurler) (born 1930), Irish hurler
Jimmy Duggan (jockey) (born 1964), English jockey